The Letipea massacre was a mass shooting of civilians by the Soviet armed forces that took place on 8 August 1976 in Letipea, Estonia, at the time part of the USSR. It resulted from a conflict between gas company workers who were having a picnic there, and drunken Soviet border guards.

One of the border guards opened fire with an assault rifle, killing nine people at the picnic and wounding 13. In addition, he shot at one of the border guards who had come to stop him, who later died in hospital. In the end, the shooter committed suicide by shooting himself in the face. The commander of the border guard unit, who took responsibility, reportedly also committed suicide.

Memorial 
A memorial stone was erected for the victims of the massacre in 1991 and the names of those who died were added in 1996.

References

1976 in Estonia
1976 suicides
1976 mass shootings in Europe
Mass murder in 1976
Massacres in 1976
Massacres in Estonia
Massacres in the Soviet Union
August 1976 events in Europe
Viru-Nigula Parish
1976 in the Soviet Union
Mass shootings in the Soviet Union
Murder–suicides in Europe
1976 murders in the Soviet Union